The following is a list of mountains and hills in the Netherlands.

 Cauberg
 Eyserbosweg
 Keutenberg
 Mount Saint Peter
 Vaalserberg
 Vrouwenheide

See also 
 List of volcanoes in the Netherlands

References 

Netherlands
Mountains
Netherlands